"Another Love Song" is a 1999 song by hip hop duo, Insane Clown Posse, performed by member Violent J, and is their first single from their album The Amazing Jeckel Brothers The song is also a part 2 to the song "Love Song" by Insane Clown Posse on their album Ringmaster.

Music

Referred to as a "psycho parody of Beck" by Barnes & Noble, the main music for "Another Love Song" – low-key Mellotron pattern – comes from his 1996 single "Jack-Ass" from Odelay. Joseph Bruce loved the song and wanted to rewrite it in his own style. Since Beck's song was built around a sample of Them's cover of the Bob Dylan song "It's All Over Now, Baby Blue", the sample was cleared with Dylan rather than Beck. The rap artist Boondox did a cover of "Another Love Song" which more closely follows the style of Beck for the album Let 'Em Bleed: The Mixxtape, Vol. 3.

Music video
Violent J, Shaggy 2 Dope, Monoxide Child and Jamie Madrox are stuck in the desert as their Dodge Charger has broken down. They push the car to a service station where a brooding woman observes the visitors. They have a meal in a diner where Violent J annoys the waiter. They go to the auto garage only to realize it is boarded up. They then go to a local trailer park and harass residents. They notice their car being driven towards them and it is driven by the brooding woman who has apparently fixed it. The woman does donuts in the trailer park kicking up dust and they have to get out of the way. They then destroy the trailer park.

References

External links

Insane Clown Posse songs
1999 singles
1999 songs
Island Records singles